Fort Norfolk may refer to:
Fort Norfolk (Norfolk County, Ontario)
Fort Norfolk (Norfolk, Virginia)
EVMC / Fort Norfolk (Tide station) in Norfolk, Virginia